Veronica is a 1972 Romanian musical film directed by Elisabeta Bostan. It was selected as the Romanian entry for the Best Foreign Language Film at the 46th Academy Awards, but was not accepted as a nominee.

Cast
  as Veronica
 Margareta Pîslaru as Teacher / Headmistress and The Fairy
 Dem Rădulescu as Dănilă the Tomcat / The Cook
  as The Vixen
 Angela Moldovan as Smaranda
 George Mihăiță as the mouse Aurică
  as the Raven
  as the mouse Mini-Cranț
 Cornel Patrichi as the Glow worm
 Ștefan Thury
 Manuela Hărăbor as little girl at the orphanage
  as little boy

See also
 List of submissions to the 46th Academy Awards for Best Foreign Language Film
 List of Romanian submissions for the Academy Award for Best Foreign Language Film

References

External links
 

1972 films
Romanian fantasy films
1970s Romanian-language films
1970s musical films
Films directed by Elisabeta Bostan
Romanian children's films